The hundred of Axminster was the name of one of thirty two ancient administrative units of Devon, England.

The parishes in the hundred were:
Axminster;
Axmouth;
Combe Raleigh;
Combpyne;
Dalwood;
Honiton;
Kilmington;
Luppitt;
Membury;
Musbury;
Rousdon;
Stockland;
Thorncombe;
Uplyme;
Upottery;
Yarcombe

See also 
 List of hundreds of England and Wales - Devon

References 

Hundreds of Devon